Göran Magnusson may refer to:
 Göran Magnusson (chemist)
 Göran Magnusson (politician)